Bronx Community Board 4 is a local government unit of the City of New York, encompassing the neighborhoods of Mount Eden, Highbridge and Concourse. It is delimited by Webster Avenue and Park Avenue to the east, Washington Bridge and the Cross Bronx Expressway to the north, the Harlem River to the west, and East 149th Street to the south.

Community board staff and membership 
The current chairperson of the Bronx Community board 4 is Kathleen Saunders. Its District Manager is Paul A. Philps. 

The City Council members representing the community district are non-voting, ex officio board members. The council members and their council districts are:
 8th NYC Council District - Diana Ayala
 16th NYC Council District - Vanessa Gibson
 17th NYC Council District - Rafael Salamanca

Demographics 
As of the United States 2010 Census, the Community Board has a population of 146,441, up from 119,962 in 1990 and 114,309 in 1980.
Of them, 81,505 (58.4%) are of Hispanic origin, 50,416 (36.1%) are Black, non-Hispanic, 2,020 (1.4%) are White, non-Hispanic, 1,984 (1.4%) are Asian or Pacific Islander, 489 (0.4%) American Indian or Alaska Native, 777 (0.6%) are some other race (non-Hispanic), and 2,372 (1.7%) of two or more races (non-Hispanic).

References

External links 
 
 

Community boards of the Bronx
Concourse, Bronx